The Baltijos Garsas Festival of Contemporary Arts began as a rock festival in a village near Kernavė, Lithuania in 2006. It has since expanded to include street theaters, circuses, art installations, video performances, lectures and seminars and other means of expression.

Music genres represented at the festival have included hard rock, folk, indie, heavy metal, ska, punk, and gothic.

References

External links

Music festivals in Lithuania
2006 establishments in Lithuania
Recurring events established in 2006
Annual events in Lithuania
Rock festivals in Lithuania